Cornelis Willem de Kiewiet (May 21, 1902 – February 15, 1986) was a Dutch-born American historian most notable for having served as president of Cornell University and the University of Rochester.

Biography
De Kiewiet was born in the Netherlands, but grew up in South Africa, where his father went as a diamond and gold-seeker and later worked as an employee of the Transvaal Republic's Railway. In the early 1920s, Cornelis earned his bachelor's and master's degrees in history from the University of Witwatersrand in Johannesburg, and, in 1927, he earned his Ph.D. in History from the University of London.

De Kiewiet emigrated to the United States in 1929 when he was offered a position teaching European history at the University of Iowa. In 1941, he joined the faculty of Cornell University, where he taught modern European history and pursued his research interests in British colonial policy, particularly in South Africa. In the mid-1940s, de Kiewiet became dean of the College of Arts and Sciences at Cornell and, in 1948, he was named University provost. The following year, de Kiewiet was appointed Cornell's acting president as well and served in that position for two years until he was recruited to become president of the University of Rochester in 1951. He served as Rochester's president until his retirement in 1961.  In retirement, de Kiewiet devoted his energies to the issue of higher education in Africa.

There is a residential building at the University of Rochester named after de Kiewiet.

Selected works

References

External links
Cornelius W. De Kiewiet papers at the Division of Rare and Manuscript Collections, Cornell University Library

1902 births
1986 deaths
Alumni of the University of London
Cornell University faculty
Dutch emigrants to the United States
20th-century South African historians
Presidents of the University of Rochester
University of the Witwatersrand alumni
Historians of South Africa
20th-century American academics